Penrhyd Lastra is a hamlet in the  community of Amlwch, Ynys Môn, Wales, which is 141.9 miles (228.3 km) from Cardiff and 221.2 miles (355.9 km) from London.

References

See also
List of localities in Wales by population

Villages in Anglesey